Hilarographa cubensis is a species of moth of the family Tortricidae. It is found on Cuba.

The larvae feed on Pinus species.

References

Moths described in 1983
Hilarographini
Endemic fauna of Cuba